Falling Leaves was an improvised ballistic missile early warning system of the United States Air Force. It was set up during the 1962 Cuban Missile Crisis, and networked 3 existing U.S. radars—2 Space Detection and Tracking System (SPADATS) radars and an Aircraft Control and Warning general surveillance radar which was modified by Sperry Corporation to  range, allowing detection in space near Cuba. The designation was assigned by the 9th Aerospace Defense Division, headquartered at Ent AFB, Colorado.

Soviet R-12 Dvina IRBMs arrived in Cuba on September 8. Intelligence sources in Cuba then reported lengthy missiles transported through towns, and three R-12 sites were photographed by Lockheed U-2s by October 19. Afterwards, the "Cuban Missile Early Warning System (CMEWS)" radars were "realigned" to monitor for nuclear missile launches from the new Soviet launch sites. 

The Falling Leaves system used the following:
RCA AN/FPS-49 Radar Set prototype of 1961 in New Jersey during development for the under-construction BMEWS Site III which was to have 3 of the tracking radars. The prototype was "withdrawn from SPADATS and realigned to provide missile surveillance over Cuba" on 24 October.
AN/FPS-78 in Texas, to which was added "real time radar display equipment" from an Alaska radar station.  (realigned 26 October)
Sperry AN/FPS-35 Frequency Diversity Radar in Alabama, operated by "Task Force Able" and later awarded a Unit Citation for Falling Leaves (698th commanded by Lt. Colonel Kenneth Gordon). (30 October)

Operations
Falling Leaves operations involved the closest radar in Alabama (newly deployed in 1962) sweeping at a lower ballistic missile altitude from Cuba first. "Then a beam from [the farther] Texas radar swept across the top of [the Alabama beam's altitude]. Finally, a radar in New Jersey was adjusted to sweep over the Texas beam."  A "Full Bird Colonel" of Task Force Able watched each "sweep go round and round … each of them had a headset, and an open  to NORAD."  Information communicated to the Ent AFB BMEWS Central Computer and Display Facility was synthesized to provide missile warning to display processors at the Pentagon and Strategic Air Command.

The FPS-49 radar detected a Cape Canaveral Titan II ICBM launch on October 26 (N-12 Mk 6 reentry vehicle test)—the trajectory was determined to be safely Southeastward over the Atlantic Missile Range.  On October 28, a test tape inserted at the New Jersey radar site caused a false alarm indicating a missile would impact Tampa and later the same day, an unidentified radar track over Georgia was recognized as a satellite.  On November 28 the New Jersey and Texas radars returned to their SPADATS mission, and the Alabama radar continued coverage for Cuba launches until late December.

After the Cuban Missile Crisis, a contract to Bendix Corporation was issued on April 2, 1962 to construct a long range radar at Eglin AFB, FL. Thus a AN/FPS-85 long-range phased-array radar was constructed beginning in October 1962.   

In 1972, 20% of the FPS-85 "surveillance capability…became dedicated to search for SLBMs.

References

Equipment of the United States Air Force
Cuban Missile Crisis
Air defence radar networks